The Redemptorist Monastery in North Perth, Western Australia, is a Roman Catholic church built in 1903 for the Redemptorist Order.  The Order had been established in Western Australia in 1899 at the instigation of Bishop of Perth Matthew Gibney.  The Monastery and Chapel is located on Vincent Street and were designed by Cavanagh & Cavanagh  (James and Michael Cavanagh), who also designed the Monastery East Wing additions in 1911/12 and the Chapel sanctuary and transcript additions which were completed in 1922.

At its opening on 13 September 1903, Bishop Gibney and New Norcia Abbot Fulgentius Torres dedicated the church to Saints Peter and Paul.

The murals in the sanctuary were painted in 1962 by Karl Matzek, Austrian artist of Czech descent. The adjacent Retreat House was completed in 1967.

The monastery is constructed of Cottesloe Limestone and is in the Federation Gothic style of architecture.

References

Further reading

Redemptorist churches
Roman Catholic churches in Perth, Western Australia
Religious buildings and structures completed in 1903
State Register of Heritage Places in the City of Vincent
Vincent Street, North Perth